Dannenberg is a town in the district Lüchow-Dannenberg, in Lower Saxony, Germany. It is situated on the river Jeetzel, approx. 30 km north of Salzwedel, and 50 km south-east of Lüneburg. Dannenberg has a population of 8,147 inhabitants as of December 2010.

Dannenberg is located on the German Timber-Frame Road.

It is the seat of the Samtgemeinde ("collective municipality") Elbtalaue. It has a soccer team which plays in the regional league, TSV Dannenberg.

The actual history of the town began with the construction of the castle (first mentioned in 1153) during the rule of Volrad I, Count of Dannenberg (1153–1169), who had been given the task of settling and securing the territory by Duke Henry the Lion. The Waldemarturm is a local historical landmark, a tower in which the Danish King Valdemar II was imprisoned from 1223 to 1224.

After World War II, Dannenberg was part of West Germany. However, it is situated very close to the Elbe river, which served as the border between East and West Germany until 1990.

Lüchow-Dannenberg is situated in a region known as the Wendland, a mostly rural and agricultural area on the eastern edge of Lower Saxony. Starting in the 1970s, Dannenberg was a center for anti-nuclear protests due to the government's plan to build a nuclear waste site in Gorleben, a municipality within the district. Much of the organizing against this facility was based in Dannenberg, notably a tractor drive from Dannenberg to Hannover culminating in a rally. Environmental activism persists as a major issue in the area.

The Polabian Names for Dannenberg are Weidars and Woikam.

Twin towns
Dannenberg is twinned with:

  Łask, Poland, since 1999

People

 Augustus the Younger, Duke of Brunswick-Lüneburg (1579-1666)
 Johannes Schultz (1582-1653), composer
 Augustin Gottfried Ludwig Lentin, (1764-1823), writer and translator of works on chemistry and metallurgy
 Eleonore Prochaska (1785-1813), who died in Dannenberg, female soldier of Napoleonic Wars
 Theodor Körner (1791-1813), wrote in Dannenberg before Battle of the Göhrde the Federal song Before the battle
 Bernhard Riemann (1826-1866),  important mathematician
 Harry Bresslau, (1848-1926), Jewish historian and diplomat, father in law of Albert Schweitzer
 Detlef Weigel (born 1961), development biologist
 Kai Fagaschinski (born 1974), jazz clarinetist and composer
 Nicolas Born (1937-1979), writer

References

External links

 Official webpage

Lüchow-Dannenberg